The Mohammed VI Mosque is a mosque in Conakry, Guinea.

History
The construction of the mosque was inaugurated on 24 February 2017 in a ceremony attended by President Alpha Condé and Morocco King Mohammed VI.

Architecture
The mosque building was constructed on a site area of 4,040 m2, which also includes a library, conference room and administrative pavilion. It has the capacity of 3,000 worshippers.

See also
 Islam in Guinea
 List of mosques in Guinea

References

Mosques in Guinea
Buildings and structures in Conakry